Wrexham is a city and the administrative centre of Wrexham County Borough in Wales. It is located between the Welsh mountains and the lower Dee Valley, near the border with Cheshire in England. Historically in the county of Denbighshire, and later the county of Clwyd in 1974, it has been the principal settlement of Wrexham County Borough since 1996.

Wrexham has historically been one of the primary settlements of Wales. At the 2011 Census, it had an urban population of 61,603 as part of the wider Wrexham built-up area which made it Wales's fourth largest urban conurbation and the largest in north Wales. The city comprises the local government communities of Acton, Caia Park, Offa and Rhosddu. Wrexham's built-up area extends further into villages like Bradley, Brymbo, Brynteg, Gwersyllt, New Broughton, Pentre Broughton and Rhostyllen.

Wrexham was likely founded prior to the 11th century and developed in the Middle Ages as a regional centre for trade and administration. The city became the most populous settlement in Wales in the 17th century and was at the forefront of the Industrial Revolution from the 18th century. Prior to de-industrialisation in the 20th century, the city and surrounding area were a hub of coal and lead mining; the production of iron, steel and leather; and brewing.

Today, Wrexham continues to serve north Wales and the Welsh borderlands as a centre for manufacturing, retail, education and administration. The city is noted for hosting Wrexham A.F.C. (one of the oldest professional football teams in the world); the nationally significant industrial heritage of the Clywedog Valley; the  National Trust Property of Erddig; and the fine Tudor church of St Giles, which towers over the historic Wrexham city centre.

History

Early history 

Human activity in the Wrexham area dates back to the Mesolithic period (8000 to 4300 BC), with tools made from flint being found to the east of the city. Two Bronze Age burial mounds are located to the west of the modern city centre and there is evidence that the area had developed into a centre for an innovative metalworking industry by the early Middle Bronze Age. A series of Iron Age hill-forts are located to the west of present-day Wrexham along the upland-lowland line suggesting the presence of an ancient tribal boundary.

At the time of the Roman conquest of Britain, the area which Wrexham formed part of was held by a tribe called the Cornovii. A Roman civilian settlement was located in the Plas Coch area of Wrexham and excavations have revealed evidence of agriculture and trade with the wider Roman world. Following the end of Roman rule in Britain, Wrexham formed part of the Romano-British Kingdom of Powys.

Medieval 

The Battle of Chester circa 615/616 marked the beginning of a long struggle between the Welsh and English for territory in this part of Wales. During the eighth century, the Anglo-Saxon royal house of Mercia pushed their frontiers westwards and established the earth boundaries of Wat's Dyke and Offa's Dyke to the west of the present city.

During this first period of Mercian advance in the eighth century, the settlement of Wrexham was likely founded on the flat ground above the meadows of the River Gwenfro.  The name Wrexham probably comes from the old English for Wryhtel's river meadow. Alternatively, the name may have described a settlement of the Wreocensæte people, who were possibly a continuation of the Cornovii tribe of Roman Britain. The settlement may have originally been named 'Caer Fantell' in Welsh but by the 13th century was recorded in Welsh as 'Gwrexham' or 'Gregsam'.

The Mercians fought over north-east Wales during the eighth to tenth centuries but the Welsh Kings of Powys re-conquered the Wrexham area during the 11th century. Following the Welsh reconquest, Wrexham formed an integral part of the Powys lordship of Maelor and so does not appear in the Domesday Book of 1086. The first recorded reference to the town in 1161 is to a castle at 'Wristlesham'.

Stability under the princes of Powys Fadog enabled Wrexham to develop as a trading town and administrative centre of one of the two commotes making up the Lordship. In 1202, Madoc ap Gruffydd Maelor, Lord of Dinas Brân, granted some of his demesne lands in 'Wrechcessham' to the  abbey of Valle Crucis and in 1220 the earliest reference to a church in Wrexham is made.

Following the loss of Welsh independence and the death in battle of Prince Llywelyn ap Gruffudd in 1282, Wrexham became part of the semi-independent Marcher lordship of Bromfield and Yale. Wrexham increased in importance throughout the Middle Ages as the lordship's administrative centre, and the then town's position made it a suitable centre for the exchange of the produce of the Dee valley and Denbighshire uplands, whilst iron and lead were also mined locally.

From 1327 onwards, the town is referred to as a villa mercatoria (market town) and became a celebrated centre for Welsh craftsmen. The town was particularly well known in the 14th and 15th centuries for the manufacture of Welsh bucklers, as illustrated by the mention in the 1547 Inventory of King Henry VIII of 'wreckesham Buckelers'. In 1391 Wrexham was wealthy enough for a bard, jester, juggler, dancer and goldsmith to earn their living there.  
The traditional pattern of Welsh life – law, administration, customs and language – remained undisturbed through the Middle Ages and the pattern was for local English people to rapidly adopt the Welsh-language and to be assimilated into Welsh culture, even  to point of adopting Welsh Patronymic surnames.

The local Welsh nobility and peasantry backed the uprising led by Owain Glyndŵr against King Henry IV of England during the early 15th century. Local poet Guto'r Glyn (c. 1412 – c. 1493) heralded Siôn ap Madog, the great-nephew of Owain Glyndŵr, as 'Alecsander i Wrecsam' ("an Alexander for Wrexham") and the poet Hywel Dafi addresses Siôn's heir as 'Gwregys am ais Gwregsam wyt''' ('a girdle around the heart of Wrexham.’).

 Early Modern 
The Acts of Union passed during the reign of Henry VIII brought the lordship into the full system of English administration and law. It became part of the new shire of Denbighshire in 1536.

In 1584 St Richard Gwyn, a local Recusant, schoolteacher, and poet in the Welsh-language, was convicted of high treason based on his Catholic beliefs by a panel of judges headed by the Chief Justice of Chester, Sir George Bromley. On 15 October 1584, Gwyn was taken to the Beast Market and hung, drawn and quartered for his faith. He was canonised by Pope Paul VI in 1970 as one of the Forty Martyrs of England and Wales. His Feast Day is 17 October. 

The main body of the church of St Giles was rebuilt in the late 15th and early 16th centuries to become one of the finest examples of ecclesiastical architecture in Wales.

The economic character remained predominantly as an agricultural market town into the 17th century but there were workshops of weavers, smiths, nailers as well as dye houses. The 1620 Norden's jury of survey of Wrexham Regis stated that four-fifths of the land-holding classes of Wrexham bore Welsh names and every field except one within the manor bore a Welsh or semi-Welsh name.

A grammar school was established in 1603 by Alderman Valentine Broughton of Chester.

During the English Civil War, most of the local Welsh gentry supported King Charles I and in 1642 the King addressed enthusiastic crowds in the town. However, local landlord Sir Thomas Myddelton declared for the Rump Parliament and Parliamentarians occupied the town in 1643 and 1645. Wrexham served as military headquarters for both forces  and a quarter of houses were burned down in 1643 during the quartering of troops in the town.

In the 17th century, Wrexham served as an educational and cultural focal point for local society and became a 'Puritan Metropolis'. Morgan Llwyd, the radical nonconformist preacher and writer, was educated at the Wrexham Grammar School and became Vicar of Wrexham in 1645.

 Late Modern 

Wrexham was known for its leather industry and by the 18th century there were a number of skinners and tanners in the town. 

The Industrial Revolution began in Wrexham in 1762 when the entrepreneur John Wilkinson (1728–1808), known as "Iron Mad Wilkinson", opened Bersham Ironworks. Wilkinson's steam engines enabled a peak of production at Minera Lead Mines on the outskirts of Wrexham.

From the late 18th century numerous large-scale industrialised collieries operated in the southern section of the North East Wales coalfield, alongside hundreds of more traditional small-scale pits belonging to a mining tradition dating back to the Middle Ages.

18th century literary visitors included Samuel Johnson, who described Wrexham as "a busy, extensive and well-built town", and Daniel Defoe who noted the role of Wrexham as a "great market for Welch flannel". The artist J. M. W. Turner also visited the town in 1792-93 and 1794 which resulted in his drawings of St Giles Parish Church and surrounding buildings and a watercolour painting of a street scene.
Rev. William Bingley described Wrexham in 1839 as "of such size and consequence as to have occasionally obtained the appellation of the metropolis of North Wales". Wrexham gained its first newspaper in 1848. The Market Hall was built in 1848, and in 1863 a volunteer fire brigade was founded.  In addition to brewing, tanning became one of Wrexham's main industries. In the mid 19th century Wrexham was granted borough status.

By 1851, the population of Wrexham was 6,714; within thirty years this had increased to 10,978 as the town became increasingly industrialised.

Wrexham benefited from good underground water supplies which were essential to the brewing of beer: by the mid-19th century, there were 19 breweries in and around the town. Wrexham Lager brewery was established in 1882 in Central Road and became the first brewery in the United Kingdom to produce lager beer. A permanent military presence was established in the town with the completion of Hightown Barracks in 1877. The Poyser Street drill hall was completed in 1902.

When the 1912 National Eisteddfod of Wales was held at Wrexham, T.H. Parry-Williams achieved for the first time the feat, almost unheard of since, of winning both the Chair and the Crown. Parry-Williams later recalled returning home to Rhyd-ddu, where he had been working as a hired hand upon the farm of a relative. Upon telling his employer of his double-victory, Parry-Williams was advised to, "seek grace." When Parry-Williams then explained that both victories had gained him £40, the relative shouted in angry disbelief, "Ac mi gwnest nhw i gyd ar dy din!!!" ("And you earned them all sitting on your arse!!!!")

By 1913, the North East Wales coal field was producing up to 3 million tonnes a year and employed over 10,000 people, dominating the economic and cultural life of the area.  One of the worst mining disasters in British history occurred at Gresford Colliery in 1934 when underground explosions and a subsequent fire cost the lives of 266 men. However the industry went into decline after the First World War, and of the seven large-scale collieries operating in the Wrexham area in 1946, only two functional collieries remained by 1968.  The last pit to close in the Borough was Bersham Colliery in 1986.The leatherworks in Pentrefelin and Tuttle Street, the many coal mines in the area, the brickworks in Abenbury, Brymbo Steelworks and the breweries all closed in the latter half of the 20th century. Wrexham suffered from the same problems as much of industrialised Britain and saw little investment in the 1970s.

In the 1980s and 1990s, the Welsh Development Agency (WDA) funded a major dual carriageway  (the A483) bypassing Wrexham town centre and connecting it with nearby Chester and with England's trunk road network. New shopping areas have been created within the town at Henblas Square, Island Green and Eagles Meadow and the Wrexham Industrial Estate, previously used in the Second World War, has become home to many manufacturing businesses.

Wrexham Town Hall, an early 18th century arcaded structure with an assembly hall on the first floor, which had been built at the top of Town Hall, was demolished to improve traffic flows in the area in February 1940.

Wrexham's former police station on Regent Street, originally the barracks for the Royal Denbighshire Militia, is now home to Wrexham County Borough Museum. The museum has two galleries devoted to the history of the city and its surrounding communities.  The museum also holds the archive of the Royal Welch Fusiliers; battalions were stationed in Wrexham during the First World War. The collection is notable for containing original documents in the handwriting of Siegfried Sassoon, Robert Graves, J. C. Dunn and other notable members of the RWF, as well as official records.

Governance
Wrexham County Borough Council is made up of 56 Councillors, with one then appointed to serve as Mayor for a year. The most recent election to the council was on 5 May 2022, the election resulted in a Independent Group–Conservative coalition, as well as various ward changes and an the addition of 4 new councillor seats from the 2022 election. The main contiguous part of the city of Wrexham, east of the A483 dual carriageway, is divided into the communities of Acton, Rhosddu, Offa and Caia Park. Although other definitions of the city, may consider Wrexham to extend westwards into other communities such as Gwersyllt and New Broughton which are part of Wrexham's built-up area.

The Wrexham constituency elects members to the UK Parliament and the Senedd. The constituency includes both the city and some of its outlying villages such as Gwersyllt, Llay, Marford, Rossett and Holt. The UK Parliament constituency of Wrexham was considered a safe seat for the Labour Party until 2019.  At the 2019 general election, Wrexham elected Sarah Atherton MP to the House of Commons, the first Conservative Member of Parliament for the constituency. Lesley Griffiths MS, Welsh Labour, has represented the Wrexham constituency in the Senedd since 2007 and has held a number of cabinet positions in the Welsh Government.

Public services
Wrexham Maelor Hospital is the region's major acute district hospital, with over 900 beds, and is the largest of the three core hospitals in North Wales. The other NHS hospital within the county borough is Chirk Community Hospital and a former Penley Polish Hospital.

Yale Hospital, situated close to the Maelor Hospital on the Wrexham Technology Park, is Wrexham's largest private hospital with over 25 beds. Formerly BUPA Yale Hospital, it is now owned and operated by Spire Healthcare.

Wrexham is served by North Wales Police; their Eastern Division HQ has a large HQ building in Llay and a police station in the city centre.

The region's main fire station is situated on Croesnewydd Road and is part of the newly combined Ambulance Service station. Other local fire stations are located in the nearby towns of Chirk and Llangollen.

City status
Wrexham has applied for city status three times since the turn of the 21st century, in competitions to mark the new Millennium, and for both the Queen's Golden and Diamond Jubilees. In March 2012, it was announced that Wrexham had again missed out on city status as the community of St Asaph, which was previously a city, was granted city status. In 2021, the Wrexham council announced their intention to apply for a fourth time for the Queen's Platinum Jubilee award.

On 20 May 2022, it was announced that as part of the Platinum Jubilee Civic Honours, Wrexham would receive city status. The status was confirmed by Letters Patent on 1 September 2022. It became Wales' seventh city.

Geography

Wrexham is not built on a major river, but on a relatively flat plateau between the lower Dee Valley and easternmost mountains of north-east Wales. This position enabled it to grow as a market town, as a crossroads between England and Wales, and later as an industrial hub – due to its rich natural reserves of iron ore and coal. But three small rivers flow through parts of the city: the Clywedog, Gwenfro and Alyn. Wrexham is also famed for the quality of its underground water reserves, which gave rise to its previous dominance as a major brewing centre.

Originally a market town with surrounding urban villages, Wrexham has now coalesced with a number of urban villages and forms North Wales' largest conurbation and city, including its western and south western suburban villages. The conurbation including Wrexham, Rhosllannerchrugog, Coedpoeth and Llay built-up areas totals over 100,000 residents. The Office for National Statistics defines a Wrexham Built-Up Area (Pop. 65,592 in 2011) making it the 134th largest built up area in the UK, and the fourth largest in Wales. Wrexham is home to approximately 40% of the total population of the county borough.

 Landmarks and attractions 

 City centre 

The historic city centre contains a large number of listed buildings set on a Medieval street pattern radiating out from the Parish Church of St Giles which was the focal point around which the city developed. The church precinct, and the surrounding narrow enclosed streets and alleyways retain a medieval character. Several complete medieval buildings survive on Town Hill and Church Street.

Hope Street, Regent Street and Queen Street form the traditional main shopping streets and are wider in some parts than others, resulting from the location of the street markets, which occurred from Medieval times through to the 19th century. The shopping streets and indoor markets are interconnected by historic narrow alleyways and arcades, such as Bank Street and Central Arcade, which host small independent businesses. The half-timbered Talbot Hotel building, built in 1904, stands in a prominent position at the junction of Hope Street and Queen Street. The Horse and Jockey Public House, was probably originally built in the 16th century as a hall-house and retains its thatched roof.

High Street is notable for its grand 18th and 19th century properties of varying scale, colour and detail which were built on long, narrow burgage plots probably of medieval origin. The 18th century façade of the Wynnstay Hotel on Yorke Street closes the vista down the High Street. The hotel is notable as the birthplace of the Football Association of Wales, which was formed at a meeting in the hotel in 1876. The Golden Lion Pub on the High Street is of 16th century origin and became an inn c.1700. The listed Border Brewery chimney towers over Tuttle Street and forms a local landmark in the city centre.

 Attractions 
Wrexham held the National Eisteddfod of Wales for the sixth time in 2011.

A number of visitor attractions can be found in the area.

Focus Wales – An annual multi-venue festival that takes place in the Wrexham city centre with a focus on emerging talent and the Welsh language.
St. Giles Church – One of the Seven Wonders of Wales and burial place of Elihu Yale
Racecourse Ground – Home of Wrexham F.C. The world's oldest international stadium that still continues to host international games.
Erddig Hall – A National Trust property.
Xplore! – Science discovery centre.
 Wrexham County Borough Museum – A museum showcasing local history.
 Indoor Markets – Wrexham has always been historically known as a market town and continues this tradition with two architecturally significant Victorian indoor markets (Butchers and General).
 Wales Comic Con – Founded and first held in Wrexham on a university campus in 2008, the event moved to Telford in 2019, but returned for a one-day event in 2022.

Venues and centres

Wrexham has a number of historic city centre buildings, many of which are pubs but others have been converted into arts or community centres.

 The Horse & Jockey pub on Hope Street
 The Golden Lion on High Street
 The Old Swan on Abbott Street.
 The Wynstay Arms Hotel on High Street – FAW was formed at the hotel on 2 February 1876. 
 Tŷ Pawb – A cultural community resource that brings together markets, arts and a food court.
 Saith Seren ("Seven Stars") – A former public house, which is now the Wrexham Welsh Centre. The venue is a bilingual community centre but retains its facilities as a pub with local food, a bar, live entertainment, community meeting facilities.

Economy
Wrexham's economy has moved away from heavy industry to high tech manufacturing, bio-technology, finance and professional services. The city also has the largest retail sector in North Wales.
In 2007, the then town was ranked fifth in the UK for business start-up success, higher than most larger UK towns and cities. 

Shopping

There are several shopping streets including Hope Street with major retailers such as New Look, WHSmith and Claire's and Bank street with independent businesses. Plas Coch and Berse retail parks are on the outskirts close to the A483. Central and Island Green retail parks are in the city centre. Eagles Meadow is a shopping and leisure development in the city, and contains shops such as M&S, Boots, and an Odeon Cinema, the development is connected to Yorke Street and High Street by a bridge. There are two traditional covered markets (General and Butchers) plus an open-air market on Mondays.

Wrexham has a Shopmobility service which is free. Much of the Wrexham city centre is pedestrianised.

Finance and professional services
Wrexham is home to DTCC, which collates and analyses company information for investment banks and financial organisations.

Moneypenny is the UK's largest outsourced switchboard and personal assistant service. Following expansion to the US and New Zealand, they built a new global headquarters at the Western Gateway site at a cost of £15 million including a treehouse meeting room, its own village pub and a sun terrace.

The Development Bank of Wales signed a lease for its new headquarters in Wrexham based on the Wrexham Technology Park, which is expected to accommodate 50 jobs.

Chetwood Financial is a fintech lender that acquired a full banking licence in 2018, the only new retail bank to secure a licence in 2018.

Industries

Wrexham Industrial Estate is one of the largest industrial areas in Europe and is home to over 340 businesses creating employment for over 10,000 people. The estate currently extends to over 550 hectares and is home to major manufacturing businesses in a range of sectors including automotive, aerospace, food, pharmaceutical and engineering.

Wrexham Industrial Estate is home to a number of biopharmaceutical companies such as Wockhardt and Ipsen which have major sites which provide research and development and manufacturing capabilities. The Industrial estate also hosts a 2,100 capacity Category C male prison, costing £212 million, which was built on the former Firestone Site. The prison opened in March 2017, and was named in February 2016 as HM Prison Berwyn.

Wrexham's close location to both aerospace (Airbus are located in nearby Broughton) and automotive manufacturers have led to a number of organisations being in the city. JCB on the Wrexham Industrial Estate, ACT and Magellan Aerospace are all major employers in the area.

Large food manufacturing sites include Kelloggs, Cadbury, Rowan Foods and Village Bakery. Electronics companies Sharp and Brother have manufacturing facilities located along the A483.

One of Wrexham's traditional industries is brewing. Wrexham was once home to Marstons, Border Breweries and Wrexham Lager. Wrexham is still a brewing town, however, on a smaller scale, many are either located on Wrexham Industrial Estate and in the city centre, this includes Big Hand, Magic Dragon, Erddig, Sandstone, Beech Avenue, Axiom and the revival of Wrexham Lager Beer.

Residential development
The central area of Wrexham has also seen a number of purpose-built residential developments as well as conversions of older buildings to residential use. Outside the city centre new estates are being developed in several areas, including over 500 homes at the former Brymbo Steelworks site, a ribbon of development on Mold Road leading out of the city (which includes four development companies) and Ruthin Road (Wrexham Western Gateway). There are further plans. These include the development of National Trust (NT) land at Erddig for over 250 homes. This latter proposal generated many protests, particularly from residents of nearby Rhostyllen. A motion at the NT's 2008 AGM to block the development gained much support but was overturned by proxy votes cast by the chairman.

Demography
According to the 2011 census, the average percentage of Welsh speakers (aged 3+) in the electoral divisions that make up the city of Wrexham was 11.01% compared to the Wales average of 19.0%. The average percentage of Welsh speakers for Wrexham County Borough Council was 12.9%, the highest proportion being in the rural Dyffryn Ceiriog division (31.2%) and the lowest in the urban Wynnstay division (7.7%).

In January 2015, it was estimated more than 2,000 Portuguese migrants live and work in the city. The community is mainly centred in the district of Hightown, and the community hold an annual carnival through the city centre.

A Polish community exists in the city with a number of Polish supermarkets and restaurants in the city centre.

In July 2019 Alyn Family Doctors, a GP practice, made a formal objection to proposals to build 300 homes in Llay and Rossett, saying "We are already overstretched and cannot cope, and any other developments in our area are unmanageable."

Culture

In 2021–22, Wrexham County Borough's bid made it to the final four bids of twenty for the title of UK City of Culture in 2025. It later lost to Bradford in May 2022.

Performing arts

A company of actors (anterliwtwyr) from Wrexham is recorded as appearing in Shrewsbury in Henry VIII's reign.

The then town is referenced in the late-Jacobean Beaumont and Fletcher play, 'The pilgrim' (1647), in which the stock Welshman declares that "Pendragon was a shentleman, marg you, Sir, and the organs at Rixum were made by revelations".

Wrexham hosted the National Eisteddfod in 1888, 1912, 1933 and 1977, as well as an unofficial National Eisteddfod event in 1876. The National Eisteddfod returned to the area in 2011, when Wales' leading festival was held on the land of Lower Berse Farm between 30 July and 6 August.

Wrexham has a number of theatres, including the Grove Park Theatre on Vicarage Hill and the Yale Studio theatre close to Llwyn Isaf, with others at Glyndŵr University on Mold Road and at Coleg Cambria. There is a multi-screen Odeon cinema in the Eagles Meadow development.

Visual arts

Tŷ Pawb (formally Oriel Wrecsam and the People's Market) is Wrexham's largest facility for visual arts and exhibitions, and offers other resources including an indoor market, food court and performance spaces. Tŷ Pawb is Welsh for "Everybody's House" and the name was selected by public vote in 2017. Tŷ Pawb was the lead organisation for Wales in the Venice Biennale 2019.

Other galleries in Wrexham include Undegun Arts Space on Regent Street and The Wrexham Independent Gallery (TWIG) on Lord Street.

Wrexham's School of Creative Arts (part of Wrexham Glyndŵr University and formally known as North Wales School of Art and Design or NWSAD) is based on Regent Street.

Music
Live music venues have developed around the core of the city. Further out of the centre other venues provide live music shows. The scene is dominated by local bands, however, mainstream musicians have attended local venues including the Racecourse Ground.

Central Station opened in 1999, the venue had a capacity of approximately 650, attracting a number of international acts. Shortly after its rebrand to Live Rooms Wrexham, it was found to be under financial pressures and closed on 9 February 2019, the year that marked its 20th anniversary. The venue re-opened in 2022 as The Rockin' Chair with local band The Royston Club as the opening act. 

William Aston Hall at Glyndŵr University is a 900-seat venue designed to accommodate a range of events from conferences and exhibitions to theatrical performances, comedy shows and pop/rock concerts. Acts who have performed there include Super Furry Animals, Feeder, Love, Ray Davies, Freddie Starr and Sweet. The Wrexham Symphony Orchestra has been the orchestra in residence at William Aston Hall since 2004.

The first known concert to be held at the Racecourse Ground was in the 1970's with live performances from KC and the Sunshine Band, Mac and Katie Kissoon and Junior Walker. In 2016 the Racecourse Ground re-introduced live music to its summer schedule, the Welsh band Stereophonics were the first musicians to play a live show since the festival with Motörhead in 1982. After the success of Stereophonics with special guests Catfish and the Bottlemen came 2017 with live music from UB 40 and Olly Murs. In June 2018 the Stereophonics returned to the Racecourse Ground alongside special guest Jake Bugg. In May 2023, Kings of Leon will be headlining shows at the Racecourse Ground

FOCUS Wales is a festival that began in 2010 to showcase musicians from Wales and around the world using venues across the city. FOCUS Wales includes interactive sessions and celebrates the arts of the region and beyond.

Media
Wrexham's newspapers include two daily titles, Reach plc's Daily Post run from Colwyn Bay, and Newsquest's The Leader (formerly Wrexham Evening Leader) run from Mold.

Two commercial radio stations broadcast from the Wrexham area – Communicorp station Heart North and Mid Wales and Global Radio-owned Capital North West and Wales broadcast from studios in Gwersyllt. A third station, Capital Cymru (serving Anglesey and Gwynedd) also broadcasts from Gwersyllt.

BBC Cymru Wales has a studio and newsroom for radio, television and online services based at Glyndŵr University on Mold Road. From March 2008 to January 2021, the university was also the base for Calon FM, a community radio station serving the county borough which now broadcasts from the Wrexham Enterprise Hub. 

Eagles Meadow is the home of Premier Radio, serving the community with music, news and information throughout the day. 

An online news website covering the Wrexham area, Wrexham.com, operates from offices in Regent Street in the city centre since 2012.

Parks and open spaces

A total of 37 parks and green spaces in Wrexham County Borough Council ownership have been, or are in the process of being, legally protected with green space charity Fields in Trust ensuring they can never be built on, nor lost to development.

Wrexham has three parks, Bellevue Park, Acton Park and the parkland at Erddig, as well as a green area within the city centre called Llwyn Isaf.

Bellevue Park was built alongside the old cemetery on Ruabon Road. The park was designed to commemorate the jubilee year of the incorporation of Wrexham. It became neglected during the 1970s and many of the amenities were in a poor state of repair. A major project was undertaken to restore the park to its original state. The park reopened in June 2000. In 2015 Belle Vue Park was dedicated as a Fields in Trust Centenary Field because of its links with veterans of two world wars.

Acton Park was originally the landscaped grounds of Acton Hall. It was laid out in 1785 by James Wyatt on the instructions of the owner Sir Foster Cunliffe.

Llwyn Isaf, situated alongside Wrexham Guildhall, is a popular green area within the city centre. The green was originally the landscaped grounds of a mansion house known as Llwyn Isaf. It now lies at the centre of Wrexham's civic centre just off Queens Square. The Welsh Children in Need concert was held here in 2005, which included Bryan Adams and Katherine Jenkins.

Erddig Park is two miles (3 km) south of the city centre where the city meets the Clywedog Valley. The park is owned and managed by the National Trust, and is home to Erddig Hall and its formal gardens.

Sport

Football

The city has a professional football team, Wrexham A.F.C., the oldest football club in Wales. Their home ground is the Racecourse Ground, the oldest international football ground in the world.

Wrexham was the site of the headquarters of the Football Association of Wales from its formation in 1876 until relocation to Cardiff in 1991.

Colliers Park has received a substantial investment to improve the facility, which was financed by FAW Wales and now recognised as a National Development Centre, complementing their existing facility in Newport.

On 16 November 2020, it was confirmed that actors Ryan Reynolds and Rob McElhenney, through the RR McReynolds Company LLC, would be taking over the club after receiving the backing of the Wrexham Supporters Trust.

Rugby League

Until the end of 2016 the Racecourse stadium was home to the North Wales Crusaders who currently play in League 1 – the third division of the sport in Britain. In 2011 North Wales were created following the folding of the Super League club Crusaders RL. The team later moved to the Queensway Stadium in Caia Park, before moving to Colwyn Bay in 2021.

Rugby Union

The Racecourse Ground has in the past also served as the secondary home of the Scarlets, one of the four Welsh professional rugby union sides that compete in the Pro14. The Wales rugby union team have also played there on occasion. Wrexham is also home to rugby union team Wrexham RFC, a team affiliated to the Welsh Rugby Union. In 1931 nine northern Welsh clubs met at Wrexham to form the North Wales Rugby Union, Wrexham RFC were one of the founders. Rhos Rugby Club, one of Wrexham RFC's main rivals are also based just outside the city in the village of Rhosllanerchrugog. Rhos now have grown to match Wrexham's quality, making the rivalry even more intense than in previous years.

Other sports
 Athletics – Queensway International Athletics stadium in Caia Park is Wrexham's second stadium after the Racecourse and has hosted the Welsh Open Athletics event in recent years. The stadium is also home to North Wales' largest athletics club, Wrexham Amateur Athletics Club. From 2017 it is home to rugby league side North Wales Crusaders.
 Hockey – Plas Coch is home to the North Wales Regional Hockey Stadium, home of Wrexham Glyndwr HC, with seating for 200 spectators and floodlighting.
 Leisure centres – Wrexham has 7 leisure centres: Chirk, Clywedog, Darland, Gwyn Evans(Gwersyllt), Plas Madoc, Queensway and Waterworld, which offer activities including swimming, aerobics, climbing walls and yoga. 
 Tennis – Wrexham is home to the North Wales Regional Tennis Centre, which plays host to a number of international competitions each year including the Challenger Series. The centre is a pay and play facility and is open 7 days a week to all members of the public. The centre is also home to the WLTA (Wrexham Lawn Tennis Association).
 Golf – Wrexham has 4 golf courses: Moss Valley Golf Club, Plassey Golf Club, Wrexham Golf Club and Clays Farm Golf Club.

Religion

Parish Church of St. Giles

St. Giles is the Parish Church of Wrexham and is considered to be the greatest medieval church in Wales. It includes a colourful ceiling of flying musical angels, two early eagle lecterns, a window by the artist Edward Burne-Jones and the Royal Welch Fusiliers chapel. In the graveyard is the tomb of Elihu Yale who was the benefactor of Yale University in New Haven, Connecticut, United States and after whom Yale College Wrexham is named. As a tribute to Yale and his resting place, a scaled-down replica of the church tower, known as Wrexham Tower was constructed at Yale University. The tower appears in an 18th-century rhyme, as one of the Seven Wonders of Wales.  In 2015, a first edition (1611) of the King James Bible (also known as the Authorized Version) was discovered in a cabinet by the Rector of the church.

St. Mary's Cathedral
The Roman Catholic Cathedral of Our Lady of Sorrows in Regent Street is the main church of the Diocese of Wrexham, which extends over all of North Wales. Built in 1857 after Catholic Emancipation and at the height of the Gothic Revival, the cathedral was home to the Bishop of Menevia from 1898 until 1987, whose diocese covered all of Wales. However, in 1987 the Roman Catholic province of Wales was reconstructed, since which time the cathedral has been home to the Bishop of Wrexham. The cathedral is also home to the relic of Saint Richard Gwyn, Wrexham's patron saint, who was a Roman Catholic martyr in the 16th century. Richard was hanged, drawn and quartered at Wrexham's Beast Market. He was canonised by Pope Paul VI in 1970.

Other denominations
Wrexham has a number of non-conformist chapels and churches around the city, including a corps of The Salvation Army. The main Methodist church is Wrexham Methodist church, built in 1971 on the site of the former Brynyfynnon Chapel on Regent Street.

Wrexham had a church with a spire dedicated to and named after St. Mark in St. Mark's Road but it was demolished in 1960 after being declared unsafe and in danger of collapse due to inadequate foundations. A multi-storey car park named St. Mark's was erected on the site.

Education

Wrexham Glyndŵr University

Named after the 14th century scholar and last Welsh Prince of Wales, Owain Glyndŵr, Wrexham Glyndŵr University was formed when the North East Wales Institute (NEWI) was granted full university status in 2008. It consists of Plas Coch campus in the western part of the city and the North Wales School of Art and Design located on Regent Street. The institution was founded in 1887 as the Wrexham School of Science and Art.

Glyndŵr remains an accredited institution of the University of Wales and offers both undergraduate and postgraduate degrees. Glyndŵr has approximately 8,000 full-time students and over 350 from outside the UK, although not all on the Wrexham campus.

Yale College (Coleg Cambria)

Yale College (now part of Coleg Cambria) is the main provider of adult education in Wrexham and is one of the largest colleges in Wales. As a tertiary college it also provides a wide range of higher education courses at its two campuses at Grove Park in the city centre and Bersham Road in southwest Wrexham.

It was named after Elihu Yale, best known for being the prime benefactor of Yale University. It was founded in 1950 as a state school on a site at Crispin Lane. In 1973, as part of the conversion of local schools to the comprehensive system, it was renamed as Yale Sixth Form College and the pupils re-located to other schools. The Crispin Lane site was incorporated into NEWI (now Glyndŵr University) after the development of the Grove Park Campus.

In 1998 Yale College took up residence in two sites across Wrexham: the faculty of engineering and construction at a site on Bersham Road, and a multi-purpose site in a redeveloped Grove Park campus. Over the next fifteen years the college grew.

In 2013 Yale College was merged with Deeside College, Northop College, and Llysfasi College to form a new college, Coleg Cambria, under the leadership of the ex-Deeside principal David Jones. The merger officially took place on 1 August 2013.

For the 2020–21 academic year, one of Coleg Cambria's Yale Grove Park Campus in Wrexham city centre, under went redevelopment. With a cost of £20 million, the new Hafod building is described to be a "commercial village" in Wrexham.

Schools
Wrexham has a number of primary and secondary schools. It has just one Welsh-speaking secondary school, Ysgol Morgan Llwyd. In 2003, three of the largest secondary schools, St David's School, Ysgol Bryn Offa and The Groves High School were merged to create two larger "super schools", Rhosnesni High School, and Ysgol Clywedog. Other large secondary schools Darland High School and Ysgol Bryn Alyn, were both built in 1958. Wrexham has become home to the first shared-faith school in Wales, St Joseph's.

There are seven Welsh medium primary schools in Wrexham County Borough, two of which are located in Wrexham city (Ysgol Bodhyfryd CP and Ysgol Plas Coch CP). Ysgol Morgan Llwyd serves as the single Welsh medium secondary school for the county and is located in Wrexham.

Twin municipalities

  Iserlohn (Märkischer Kreis), Germany
  Racibórz, Poland

The city of Wrexham is twinned with the German district of Märkischer Kreis and the Polish town of Racibórz.

The first twinning was established on 17 March 1970 between the former Kreis Iserlohn and Wrexham Rural District. Its early success ensured that, after local government reorganisation in both countries in the mid-seventies, the twinning was taken over by the new Councils of Märkischer Kreis and Wrexham Maelor Borough Council and, in 1996, by Wrexham County Borough Council.

In 2001 Märkischer Kreis entered a twinning arrangement with Racibórz (Ratibor), a county in Poland, which was formerly part of Silesia, Germany. In September 2002, a delegation from Racibórz visited Wrexham and began initial discussions about possible co-operation which led, eventually, to the signing of Articles of Twinning between Wrexham and Racibórz in March 2004. The Wrexham area has strong historical links with Poland. Following World War II, many service personnel from the Free Polish armed forces who had been injured received treatment at Penley Polish Hospital. Many of their descendants remain in the area to this day.

Transport

Rail

Wrexham has two railway stations, Wrexham General and Wrexham Central, with Gwersyllt located in the city's western suburbs. Until the early 1980s what is now platform 4 of Wrexham General, serving the Wrexham Central – Bidston service, was a separate station, Wrexham Exchange. There were plans for two new railway stations named after but located outside the then town in 2017: Wrexham North and Wrexham South.

Wrexham General

Wrexham General was opened in 1846, rebuilt in 1912 and again in 1997. It has six platforms (four through, two terminal). Wrexham General is on two different lines, the Shrewsbury to Chester Line and the Borderlands Line, both of which are run by Transport for Wales.

Wrexham General was also the base for the former train operating company Wrexham & Shropshire (the operating name of the Wrexham, Shropshire and Marylebone Railway Company). The company-provided passenger train services from Wrexham via Shropshire to London Marylebone on an open-access basis. Services started in 2008, with an agreement for a seven-year period. Wrexham & Shropshire began running services on 28 April 2008. Having decided they could not make the business profitable, the company ended services on 28 January 2011.

All services that operate from Wrexham Central to Bidston also run through this station.

Wrexham Central

Wrexham Central, which is located on the Island Green retail park, is a small terminus station which is the southern terminus of the Wrexham to Bidston in Birkenhead Borderlands Line. Until the 1998 construction of the Island Green retail park, Wrexham Central station was located 50 metres further along the track.

Gwersyllt

 is an unmanned halt which serves the Gwersyllt suburb of Wrexham. It is a stop on the Borderlands line between Wrexham General and Bidston.

Bus

Most buses are low-floor and with slightly elevated bus stops to allow easy access. A bus terminal, the largest in north Wales, has been built in Wrexham, with a staffed information booth. The bus station serves local, regional and long-distance bus services. It is served by various bus companies, including Arriva Buses Wales and Stagecoach. Long-distance coaches are available to Edinburgh via Manchester, Bradford and Leeds and to London via Telford and Birmingham. The Wrexham Shuttle provides a link between Wrexham and the nearby industrial estate. The townlink bus connects the main bus station with Eagles Meadow shopping centre and Border retail park to the east and Wrexham General and Central stations with Plas Coch, Wrexham Central and Island Green shopping centres to the south and west of the city. Wrexham is served by the National Express coach network, which picks up from the Wrexham bus station. Wrexham use the distinctive yellow American Bluebird school buses.

Roads

The city centre is orbited by a ring road. The northern and eastern parts of the road are dualled between Rhosddu Road roundabout and Eagles Meadow. The A483 is Wrexham's principal route. It skirts the western edge of the city, dividing it from the urban villages to the west. The road has connections with major roads (A55(M53), A5(M54)). The A5156 leads to the A534 and on to the Wrexham Industrial Estate. The A541 road is the main route into Wrexham from Mold and the city's western urban area. It connects to the B5101 road which eventually leads to the A5104 road to the east of Treuddyn in Flintshire.

Future development

The Welsh Government has acquired key sites to form part of the Wrexham Gateway Project to redevelop the Kop stand at the Racecourse Ground and upgrade the transportation network to support the upgrade in the sport and event facility. Work is expected to begin before June 2023 on the redevelopment of a new 5,500 seater stand at Wrexham AFC in time for the 2024/2025 season. 

£5.4 million funding has been agreed for the redevelopment of the Wrexham Museum that will integrate a Welsh Football Museum, which has been dubbed a museum of two halves. The football museum will have a number of themes including Welsh language communities, fan culture, Black, Asian and Minority Ethnic communities and LGBTQ+ experiences.

A health and wellbeing complex at Coleg Cambria is expected to be built by summer 2024 at a cost of £14 million.

Notable people

Jack Mary Ann – local folk hero who lived in the Top Boat House area of Broughton
Chris Bartley – Olympic silver medallist rower.
William Davidson Bissett (1893–1971) – Scots-born Victoria Cross recipient. Cremated at Pentre Bychan.
Hannah Blore – Byte Class; Women's World Champion, 2005, 2008
David Bower – deaf actor who is best known for his role as David, the younger brother of Charles, in the comedy Four Weddings and a Funeral.
Grahame Davies (1964– ) – poet
Charles Harold Dodd (1884–1973) – eminent New Testament scholar and influential Protestant theologian
Percy William Dodd (1889–1931) – classics lecturer at the University of Leeds and captain in the West Yorkshire Regiment during the Great War
Arthur Herbert Dodd (1891–1975) – Welsh historian and professor of history at University College, Bangor
Dr Harold Drinkwater (1855–1925) – physician noted as a botanical artist
Stephen Evans (actor) - (born, 1970) Hyperdrive (British TV series) actor
Dr Thomas Eyton-Jones (1832–1893) –  medical professional
Rosemarie Frankland – Miss Wales 1961, first runner-up Miss Universe 1961, Miss United Kingdom 1961 and Miss World 1961.
Amy Guy gladiator 'SIREN' on the TV show of the same name. Member of the British Team in horse riding. Miss Wales 2004 Miss World Sport 2004. Miss United Kingdom 2005.
Saint Richard Gwyn – (1535–1584), Catholic martyr and Patron Saint of Wrexham
Edwin Hughes – ("Balaclava Ned") (1830–1927), the last survivor of the Charge of the Light Brigade at Balaklava in the Crimea
Mark Hughes – former Wales international footballer and subsequently manager of Wales and several clubs
Dennis Taylor – ex-snooker World Champion, currently living in Llay.
Tom James – Olympic Gold Medallist Rower.
George Jeffreys (1645–1689), 'The Hanging Judge' of Acton Hall in Acton
Darren Jeffries – Hollyoaks actor
Dewi Penrhyn Jones – professional cricketer for Glamorgan C.C.C.2014. Born in Wrexham 1994
Professor Sir Ewart Ray Herbert Jones FRS (1911-2002) – chemist, inventor of the Jones oxidation, Waynflete Professor of Chemistry at Oxford University
Joey Jones – former Wales international footballer
Rob Jones – former footballer who played for Liverpool F.C.
Jason Koumas – former Wales international footballer
Charlie Landsborough – (born 1941), British country and folk musician and singer-songwriter
Tom Lawrence – Wales international footballer
David Lord – (1913–1944), Irish born holder of the Victoria Cross and Distinguished Flying Cross
Andy Moore – Neath/Swansea Rugby Club & Wales International
Seb Morris – (racing driver), Also appeared as the face of Jack Wills Autumn/Winter 2013 campaign
Jonathon O'Dougherty – British National Ice Dance champion
 John Godfrey Parry-Thomas – (1884–1927), engineer and racing driver
Leigh Richmond Roose (1877-1916) – former Wales international footballer
Leonard Rowland (1862–1939), mayor of Wrexham 
Robbie Savage – former Wales international footballer
Andy Scott – guitarist with 1970s glam rock band The Sweet
Tim Vincent – former Blue Peter presenter and former Access Hollywood'' reporter.
Robert Waithman – (1764–1833), born in Wrexham, became Lord Mayor of London in 1823
John "Iron-Mad" Wilkinson – (1728–1808), son of Isaac, known for Bersham Ironworks in the city and producing cannons for the American civil war
Llŷr Williams – Welsh pianist, received the Outstanding Young Artist Award from MIDEM Classique and the International Artist Managers' Association
Mike Williams – Welsh journalist, Editor in Chief of NME
Neco Williams – Nottingham Forest and Wales footballer
Elihu Yale – (1649–1721), businessman and benefactor of Yale University
Philip Yorke – (1743–1804), antiquarian and writer, squire of Erddig
Thomas Penson – (c. 1790 – 1859), Welsh architect and county surveyor.
Neck Deep – Welsh pop punk band formed in 2012
Harry Wilson – Fulham and Wales international footballer

Notes

References

 
Towns in Wrexham County Borough
Towns of the Welsh Marches
Market towns in Wales
The Lordship of Bromfield and Yale
Cities in Wales